The Human Contradiction is the fourth studio album by the Dutch symphonic metal band Delain. It was released on 4 April 2014 in Europe, and on 8 April 2014 in North America.

The album features guest appearances from Alissa White-Gluz, Marko Hietala and George Oosthoek.

Background
According to lead singer Charlotte Wessels, the album's title was inspired by Octavia E. Butler's science fiction trilogy Lilith's Brood. 'The Human Contradiction' refers to humans in general being highly intelligent and hierarchically structured at the same time. The songwriting, however, was not influenced by Lilith's Brood but continues the theme of being different that was portrayed by Delain's previous album We Are the Others. It charted at number 25 on the Official Album Charts in their native country of Netherlands, as well as charting at number 44 on the Official Album Charts in the United Kingdom.

Reception

A joint review by 10 Sonic Seducer writers found that The Human Contradiction was a well-produced gothic metal album oriented towards Within Temptation, but without any new impulses. A reviewer for the Decibel magazine wrote, too, that the album contained nothing new, but was well crafted. According to Metal Hammer Germany, The Human Contradiction was in fact different than other releases by Delain in that it contained a tiny musical allowing Charlotte Wessels to present the full range of her voice. The reviewer noted though that the album was "too hard for sophisticated pop, [and] too shallow to have any rocking depth." Matt Farrington for All About The Rock said "It would be nice to see them pushing the boundaries more to see what else can be delivered.  That said it would be a tough task for them to deliver a better record than April Rain back in 2009".

Track listing

Personnel

Delain 
Charlotte Wessels – vocals
Martijn Westerholt – keyboards
Timo Somers – guitars
Otto Schimmelpenninck van der Oije – bass
Sander Zoer – drums

Additional musicians 
Marko Hietala – clean male vocals (2, 6)
George Oosthoek – death growls (5)
Alissa White-Gluz – death growls & clean female backing vocals (9)
Georg Neuhauser – backing vocals (9)
Guus Eikens – additional guitars 
Oliver Philipps – additional guitars, arrangements, engineer (vocals)
Mike Coolen – additional drums
Ruben Israel – additional drums
Mikko P. Mustonen – orchestration

Production
Martijn Westerholt – production, arrangements
Arno Krabman – drum engineering
Ad Sluijter – guitar engineering
Christian Moos – guitar engineering, mixing
André Zoer – live recording engineering
Fredrik Nordström – mixing
Henrik Udd – mixing
Ted Jensen – mastering at Sterling Sound, New York
Das Buro – artwork, design
Sandra Ludewig – photography

Charts

References

External links 
 Metallum Archives

2014 albums
Delain albums
Napalm Records albums